Wartelle is a surname. Notable people with the surname include:

Julien Wartelle (1889–1943), French gymnast
Paul Wartelle (1892–1974), French gymnast
Philippe Wartelle (born 1969), French boxer

See also
Wartell